Carmelo Jordão Airport , is the airport serving Angra dos Reis, Brazil. It is named after a local entrepreneur.

It is managed by Angra Aero-Portos.

History
The airport was commissioned in 1979.

Airlines and destinations

Access

See also

List of airports in Brazil

References

External links

Airports in Rio de Janeiro (state)
Airports established in 1979
Angra dos Reis